Local elections were held in the Indian state of Gujarat in 2021. Elections were held for 8,235 seats, with 237 seats having only one unopposed candidates. No form was filled for two seats in Taluka panchayat. The elections included six municipal corporations where elections took place in February — Ahmedabad, Surat, Vadodara, Rajkot, Bhavnagar and Jamnagar – and one (Gandhinagar) in which the elections were held on 3 October. Results to Gandhinagar Municipal Corporation were declared on 5 October 2021.

Before the elections, the Bharatiya Janata Party (BJP) ruled all the municipal corporations in the state.

Background
In previous elections, the BJP won 389 seats and Indian National Congress (INC) won 176 seats. In 2017 BJP won the state assembly elections and was able to win all Lok Sabha seats in 2019.

In 2021, Aam Aadmi Party (AAP) and All India Majlis-e-Ittehadul Muslimeen (AIMIM) had also decided to contest elections to civic bodies. This is the first election in state since COVID-19 pandemic began. Candidates in 6 corporations include 577 from the BJP, 566 by Congress, and 470 by AAP. Election to Gandhinagar Municipal Corporation were held in October 2021 to 44 seats across 11 wards. Results were declared on 5 October 2021.

For Gandhinagar elections BJP and Congress have given 44 candidates each and AAP has given 40 candidates. The elections to Gujarat local bodies were held in view of strict COVID-19 guidelines

Voters

The six municipal corporations reported an average 46.1% voting.

Results

Votes percentage (party wise)

By municipal corporation
BJP won all the 6 Municipal Corporation. Congress, the biggest opposition party, had won 55 seats. AAP became biggest opposition in Surat Municipal Corporation. AAP won seats in Surat and Gandhinagar Municipal elections.

BJP gained 94 seats while Congress lost 121 seats this time.

AIMIM also contested local body polls and won seven seats in Ahmedabad's Muslim-dominated Jamalpur and Maktampura wards. Bahujan Samaj Party (BSP) won 3 seats in Jamnagar Municipal Corporation. In 6 municipalities and 15 taluka panchayats, no party holds clear majority. In October 2021 results for Gandhinagar Municipal elections were declared. BJP won the election to Gandhinagar Corporation too with 40 seats. In all the 7 bodies BJP won with majority.

Ahmedabad Municipal Corporation

Surat Municipal Corporation

Vadodara Municipal Corporation

Bhavnagar Municipal Corporation

Jamnagar Municipal Corporation

Rajkot Municipal Corporation

Gandhinagar Municipal Corporation

Reactions
Prime Minister Modi congratulated the party's workers. CM Vijay Rupani expressed his gratitude towards Gujarati people. Delhi Chief Minister Arvind Kejriwal did a road show in Surat for party's representation as main opposition. Home Minister Amit Shah expressed his gratitude towards Gujarati people and party workers.

References

External links
 Gujarat: Voting for 6 municipal corporations underway amid strict Covid norms
 LIVE: Gujarat Taluka Panchayat Elections Results 2021: BJP wins 1036 seats - Check latest news updates, seats details here
 Gandhinagar municipal election to be held on October 3

2021 elections in India
Elections in Gujarat